The Ducati PaulSmart 1000 LE (PS1000LE) is a retro styled motorcycle built by Ducati in 2006 to commemorate Paul Smart's win at the Imola 200 race in 1972, a win that helped define Ducati's future approach to racing. The bike is styled in the fashion of the Ducati 750 Imola Desmo race bike that Paul Smart rode to victory, and the 1974 750 SuperSport it originally inspired. It is one of the SportClassic series designed by Pierre Terblanche.

Styling
The bike is styled to look like a race bike from the 1970s, the rounded bubble style half fairing and café racer tail section are very reminiscent of the race winning 750 Imola Desmo. A green finished frame, outboard dampers and wire spoked rims with special Pirelli Phantom tires (featuring a retro tread pattern made exclusively for the PS1000LE) complete the look.

Specifications

The PS1000LE is powered by a  90° V-twin cylinder, 2-valves per cylinder desmodromic, air-cooled engine with Marelli injectors on a  throttle body connected to a 6-speed transmission. Exhaust gasses are directed to twin mufflers mounted high on the right side of the rear wheel.

The chassis consists of a tubular steel trellis. For the suspension, an Öhlins 43 mm upside-down fully adjustable fork is used for the front while a fully adjustable monoshock also from Ohlins is mounted on the left side of the rear wheel.

Notes

External links 
PaulSmart 1000 LE at Ducati's official website.
750 Imola Desmo at Ducati's official website.

PaulSmart 1000 LE
Standard motorcycles
Sport bikes
Motorcycles introduced in 2005